(Japanese: ; Korean: ; Vietnamese: ngũ hành (五行)), usually translated as Five Phases or Five Agents, is a fivefold conceptual scheme that many traditional Chinese fields used to explain a wide array of phenomena, from cosmic cycles to the interaction between internal organs, and from the succession of political regimes to the properties of medicinal drugs. The "Five Phases" are Fire, Water, Wood, Metal or Gold, and Earth or Soil. This order of presentation is known as the "Days of the Week" sequence. In the order of "mutual generation", they are Wood, Fire, Earth, Metal, and Water. In the order of "mutual overcoming", they are Wood, Earth, Water, Fire, and Metal. 

The system of five phases was used for describing interactions and relationships between phenomena. After it came to maturity in the second or first century BCE during the Han dynasty, this device was employed in many fields of early Chinese thought, including seemingly disparate fields such as Yi jing divination, alchemy, feng shui, astrology, traditional Chinese medicine, music, military strategy, and martial arts. Although often translated as the Five Elements in comparison to Classical elements of the ancient Mediterranean world, the Wuxing were conceived primarily as cosmic agents of change rather than a means to describe natural substances.

Etymology

Xíng of wǔxíng means moving; a planet is called a 'moving star' ( xíngxīng) in Chinese. Wǔxíng originally refers to the five major planets (Jupiter, Saturn, Mercury, Mars, Venus) that create five dimensions of earth life. Wǔxíng is also widely translated as "Five Elements" and this is used extensively by many including practitioners of Five Element acupuncture. This translation arose by false analogy with the Western system of the four elements. Whereas the classical Greek elements were concerned with substances or natural qualities, the Chinese xíng are "primarily concerned with process and change," hence the common translation as "phases" or "agents". By the same token, Mù is thought of as "Tree" rather than "Wood". The word element is thus used within the context of Chinese medicine with a different meaning to its usual meaning.

It should be recognized that the word phase, although commonly preferred, is not perfect. Phase is a better translation for the five seasons ( wǔyùn) mentioned below, and so agents or processes might be preferred for the primary term xíng. Manfred Porkert attempts to resolve this by using Evolutive Phase for  wǔxíng and Circuit Phase for  wǔyùn, but these terms are unwieldy.

Some of the Mawangdui Silk Texts (no later than 168 BC) also present the wǔxíng as "five virtues" or types of activities. Within Chinese medicine texts the wǔxíng are also referred to as wǔyǔn or a combination of the two characters ( wǔxíngyǔn) these emphasise the correspondence of five elements to five 'seasons' (four seasons plus one).

Cycles
The doctrine of five phases describes two cycles, a generating or creation ( shēng) cycle, also known as "mother-son", and an overcoming or destruction ( kè) cycle, also known as "grandfather-grandson", of interactions between the phases. Within Chinese medicine the effects of these two main relations are further elaborated:
Inter-promoting ( xiāngshēng): the effect in the generating ( shēng) cycle
Weakening ( xiāngxiè): the effect in a deficient or reverse generating ( shēng) cycle
Inter-regulating ( xiāngkè): the effect in the overcoming ( kè) cycle
Overacting ( xiāngchéng): the effect in an excessive overcoming ( kè) cycle
Counteracting ( xiāngwǔ or  xiānghào): the effect in a deficient or reverse overcoming ( kè) cycle

Inter-promoting
Common verbs for the shēng cycle include "generate", "create" or "strengthens", as well as "grow" or "promote". The phase interactions in the shēng cycle are:
Wood feeds Fire
Fire produces Earth (ash, lava)
Earth bears Metal (geological processes produce minerals)
Metal collects Water (water vapor condenses on metal, for example)
Water nourishes Wood (Water flowers, plants and others changes in forest)

Weakening
A deficient shēng cycle is called the xiè cycle and is the reverse of the shēng cycle. Common verbs for the xiè include "weaken", "drain", "diminish" or "exhaust". The phase interactions in the xiè cycle are:
Wood depletes Water
Water rusts Metal
Metal impoverishes Earth (overmining or over-extraction of the earth’s minerals)
Earth smothers Fire
Fire burns Wood (forest fires)

Inter-regulating
Common verbs for the kè cycle include "controls", "restrains" and "fathers", as well as "overcome" or "regulate". The phase interactions in the kè cycle are:
Wood parts (or stabilizes) Earth (roots of trees can prevent soil erosion)
Earth contains (or directs) Water (dams or river banks)
Water dampens (or regulates) Fire
Fire melts (or refines or shapes) Metal
Metal chops (or carves) Wood

Overacting
An excessive kè cycle is called the chéng cycle. Common verbs for the chéng cycle include "restrict", "overwhelm", "dominate" or "destroy". The phase interactions in the chéng cycle are:
Wood depletes Earth (depletion of nutrients in soil, over-farming, overcultivation)
Earth obstructs Water (over-damming)
Water extinguishes Fire
Fire vaporizes Metal
Metal overharvests Wood (deforestation)

Counteracting
A deficient kè cycle is called the wǔ cycle and is the reverse of the kè cycle. Common verbs for the wǔ cycle can include "insult" or "harm". The phase interactions in the wǔ cycle are:
Wood dulls Metal
Metal de-energizes Fire (metals conduct heat away)
Fire evaporates Water
Water muddies (or destabilizes) Earth
Earth rots Wood (overpiling soil on wood can rot the wood)

Celestial stem

Ming neiyin
In Ziwei, neiyin or the method of divination is the further classification of the Five Elements into 60 ming, or life orders, based on the ganzhi. Similar to the astrology zodiac, the ming is used by fortune-tellers to analyse a person's personality and future fate.

Applications
The Wuxing philosophy is applied to explain different concepts in various fields.

Phases of the Year
The five phases are around 73 days each and are usually used to describe the transformations of nature rather than their formative states.
Wood/Spring: a period of growth, which generates abundant vitality, movement and wind. 
Fire/Summer: a period of swelling, flowering, expanding with heat.
Earth can be seen as a transitional period between the other phases or seasons  or when relating to transformative seasonal periods it can be seen as late Summer. This period is associated with stability, leveling and  dampness.
Metal/Autumn: a period of harvesting, collecting and dryness.
Water/Winter: a period of retreat, stillness, contracting and coolness.

Cosmology and feng shui

According to wuxing theory, the structure of the cosmos mirrors the five phases. Each phase has a complex series of associations with different aspects of nature, as can be seen in the following table. In the ancient Chinese form of geomancy, known as Feng Shui, practitioners all based their art and system on the five phases (wuxing). All of these phases are represented within the trigrams. Associated with these phases are colors, seasons and shapes; all of which are interacting with each other.

Based on a particular directional energy flow from one phase to the next, the interaction can be expansive, destructive, or exhaustive. A proper knowledge of each aspect of energy flow will enable the Feng Shui practitioner to apply certain cures or rearrangement of energy in a way they believe to be beneficial for the receiver of the Feng Shui Treatment.

Dynastic transitions
According to the Warring States period political philosopher Zou Yan (c. 305–240 BCE), each of the five elements possesses a personified "virtue" (de ), which indicates the foreordained destiny (yun ) of a dynasty; accordingly, the cyclic succession of the elements also indicates dynastic transitions. Zou Yan claims that the Mandate of Heaven sanctions the legitimacy of a dynasty by sending self-manifesting auspicious signs in the ritual color (yellow, blue, white, red, and black) that matches the element of the new dynasty (Earth, Wood, Metal, Fire, and Water). From the Qin dynasty onward, most Chinese dynasties invoked the theory of the Five Elements to legitimize their reign.

Chinese medicine 

The interdependence of zang-fu networks in the body was said to be a circle of five things, and so mapped by the Chinese doctors onto the five phases.

In order to explain the integrity and complexity of the human body, Chinese medical scientists and physicians use the Five Elements theory to classify the human body's endogenous influences on organs, physiological activities, pathological reactions, and environmental or exogenous influences. This diagnostic capacity is extensively used in traditional five phase acupuncture today, as opposed to the modern eight principles based Traditional Chinese medicine. Furthermore in combination the two systems are the study of postnatal and prenatal influencing on genetics, psychology and sociology.

Music

The Yuèlìng chapter of the Lǐjì and the Huáinánzǐ make the following correlations:

 In this use, the Chinese word  (qīng) is an ambiguous color inclusive of both green and blue as its shades. This concept is common in many languages but largely alien to modern English, where it is only sometimes encountered as "grue". See the article on "blue–green distinction in language" for further details. It is said that this is the color of a dragon's scales when seen through the mist.
 In most modern music, various five note or seven note scales (e.g., the major scale) are defined by selecting five or seven frequencies from the set of twelve semi-tones in the Equal tempered tuning. The Chinese "lǜ" tuning is closest to the ancient Greek tuning of Pythagoras.

Martial arts
T'ai chi ch'uan uses the five elements to designate different directions, positions or footwork patterns. Either forward, backward, left, right and centre, or three steps forward (attack) and two steps back (retreat).

The Five Steps ( wǔ bù):
Jìn bù (in simplified characters ) – forward step
Tùi bù – backward step
Zǔo gù (in simplified characters ) – left step
Yòu pàn – right step
Zhōng dìng – central position, balance, equilibrium

Xingyiquan uses the five elements metaphorically to represent five different states of combat.

Wuxing heqidao, Gogyo Aikido (五行合气道) is an art form with its roots in Confucian, Taoists and Buddhist theory. This art is centralised around applied peace and health studies and not that of defence or material application. The unification of mind, body and environment is emphasised using the anatomy and physiological theory of yin, yang and five-element Traditional Chinese medicine. Its movements, exercises and teachings cultivate, direct and harmonise the Qi.

Gogyo
The Japanese term is gogyo (Japanese:五行, romanized: gogyō). During the 5th and 6th centuries (Kofun period), Japan adopted various philosophical disciplines such as Taoism, Chinese Buddhism and Confucianism through monks and physicians from China. In particular, wuxing was adapted into gogyo. These theories have been extensively practiced in Japanese acupuncture and traditional Kampo medicine.

See also 

 Acupuncture
Classical element
 Color in Chinese culture
 Flying Star Feng Shui
 Humorism
 Qi
 Wu Xing painting
 Zang Fu
 Yin and yang

References

Further reading 
 Feng Youlan (Yu-lan Fung), A History of Chinese Philosophy, volume 2, p. 13
 Joseph Needham, Science and Civilization in China, volume 2, pp. 262–23.

External links 
 Wuxing (Wu-hsing). The Internet Encyclopedia of Philosophy, .

 
Chinese philosophy
Taoist cosmology
Eastern esotericism